The McGregor Hall is a historic building designed by Walter F. Douglas and Thomas Duncan Hetherington and built in 1903. The building is located on the grounds of the Colorado College in Colorado Springs, Colorado. The building was the third dormitory for women on the Colorado College campus.

The building is notable for its Colorado Springs red sandstone, and is built in the Colonial Revival style. The property was listed on the National Register of Historic Places in 2000.

See also 

 National Register of Historic Places listings in El Paso County, Colorado

References 

Buildings and structures on the National Register of Historic Places in Colorado
1903 establishments in Colorado
Buildings and structures in Colorado Springs, Colorado